Magdiel is a Youth Aliyah boarding school in Hod Hasharon, Israel.

History
Magdiel was established as a home and school for children who survived the Holocaust. Its location, Magdiel, was an agricultural village founded in 1924 by Jewish immigrants from Russia, Poland and Lithuania, later joined by a group from the Netherlands.

In 1964, the village of Magdiel, along with Ramatayim, Hadar, and Ramat Hadar, merged to become Hod Hasharon.

Other schools at Magdiel include a comprehensive secondary school and a technical vocational boarding school of the ORT educational network.

Notable residents
Zeev Sternhell

See also
Education in Israel

References

Buildings and structures in Central District (Israel)
Schools in Israel
Hod HaSharon